Zero hour is a term referring to midnight on 8 May 1945 in Germany. It marked the end of World War II in Europe and the start of a new, non-Nazi Germany. It was partly an attempt by Germany to dissociate itself from the Nazis. Denazification was encouraged by the Allies occupying Germany.

The term implies "an absolute break with the past and a radical new beginning" or a "sweeping away of old traditions and customs". People at the time were living in a devastated country – roughly 80 percent of its infrastructure was in need of repair or reconstruction – which helped the idea that Germany was entering a new phase of history.

History of the term 
The term was first used in World War I, and it was used to say "a time at which some great military action has to take place". The term 'zero hour' appears in various sources throughout post-world war one history. It is mostly used in terms of a militaristic concept (as it was when it was first coined), Richard Freund (a journalist) used the term as a call to war, he talks of Hitler's occupation of the Rhineland, and the Spanish civil war pushing the world to the edge, and, then he says "The next flash may be the signal. It is Zero Hour". Not only was it used in militaristic terms, it also suggests a call to action, Erika Mann says "And one man should be forbidden to entreat you: 'Act! This is your hour, it's the final hour – the Zero Hour!" she calls the American people to action (also during WWII). The term was used to illustrate the need for America to act in World War II, it was used to show the urgency for an American military intervention. Both were used in militaristic settings, displaying urgency to their respective audiences, to the need to intervene and help stop the German advances. It was not until the post-war period that the term was used to refer to the "new beginning" of Germany.

Allied occupation of Germany 

During the post-war period Germany was split up into four zones controlled by the Soviet Union, the United States of America, France, and the United Kingdom. A main cultural impact of this occupation was the denazification process that each of the occupying powers put in place. The main plan to accomplish this was through 're-education', without the German people noticing the shift. This was done, because for the most part (at least on the Allies' side) the new political culture was not supposed to be imposed on Germany, for fears of the Germans rejecting these ideas if they felt they were being reeducated, but the Allies also wanted to make sure that there would not be another Nazi-like regime.

The Americans used techniques developed in psychiatry during the 1930s to de-Nazify West Germany. The concept of re-education then was developed originally to change people who had severe delusionary disorders, but it was redone to try and change the German culture at the time. To do this, sociologists, anthropologists, and psychologists studied the differences between democratic and totalitarian societies, to try and find a way to make passing democratic values and traditions to the German people more effective. They encouraged a focus on human values, in favor of 'super human values', that is to say a change from focusing on the state, to instead focusing on individuals. Kurt Lewin suggested that the German people should be given training on how to organize themselves in democratic society, and that this should be done as subtly as possibly, to avoid the German people rejecting democratic ideas. In practice, this meant roughly ten policies that the U.S would enact. First 'white lists', or lists of anti-Nazis who would be entrusted with political, educational, and other positions. Second a screening process was put in to regulate who could become newspaper editors and run publishing houses. Next new political parties were allowed to form in small towns for elections. German prisoners of war were 're-educated'. Information centers were made to let Germans learn about how democracy was going to work. Exchange programs were put in place to let German people see the United States for themselves. Trade unions were formed. Denazification was started, which tried former Nazis for crimes they committed during the Nazi regime. Finally, gewerbefreiheit was put in place, which allowed Germans the freedom to practice a trade, gave freedom of economic activity.

However, the Allied occupation did not go entirely as planned, one of the integration processes was to show the German people how race functioned in modern society, so there would not be a repeat of the hyper racialized society created by Nazi Germany. But this message of tolerance was possibly lost in this, because of how America at the time was dealing with race. The American military was segregated up to 1948, and from those that were trying to teach the German people tolerance this demonstrated that intolerance still existed in American democratic society.

The situation in Berlin 

When the Soviets (who were the first occupying power) arrived in Berlin, they saw a city devastated by the air raids and street fighting. It was described as a Geisterstadt ("ghost town").

Extent of the devastation
 48,000 of the 245,000 buildings in Berlin were destroyed.
 One third of all private apartments were totally destroyed.
 23% of industrial capacity was obliterated and the rest was dismantled for transportation by the Russians in the demontage (disassembly).
 There were 75 million tons of rubble, which equated to th of all the rubble in Germany.
 All electricity, gas and water supplies were destroyed:
 It was forbidden to wash one's whole body.
 The transport network was badly destroyed:
 The underground stations had been flooded and over 90 of them had been bombed.
 The first buses resumed service on May 19.
 78,000 deaths:
 50,000 victims of the air raids.
 977 suicides.
 A further 4,000 died daily in August 1945, because of the cholera and diphtheria epidemics.
 The population shrank and the demographics were significantly altered:
 4.3 million lived in Berlin before the war, but only 2.8 million afterwards.
 One quarter of the population were over 60.
 1 in 10 was under 30.
 There were 16 women to every 10 men.

Das Aufräumen ("The clean-up")
The job of cleaning up the city fell to the Soviets, as they were first (the Western Allies arrived on July 4, 1945) to enter the city. According to them, the clean-up operation would last 12 years.

On May 29, all women aged between 15 and 65 were conscripted as Trümmerfrauen (rubble women). In all, 60,000 women worked to rebuild Berlin.

Rations and starvation
The biggest problem that the Berliners had to face was the threat of starvation. German war-time ration cards were no longer valid. Any remaining rations were either used to feed Russian troops or stolen by hungry Germans.

On May 15, the Russians introduced a new five-tier ration-card system: The highest tier was reserved for intellectuals and artists; rubble women and Schwerarbeiter (manual workers) received the second-tier card, which was more valuable to them than the 12 Reichsmark they received for cleaning up a thousand bricks; the lowest card, nicknamed the Friedhofskarte (cemetery ticket) was issued to housewives and the elderly.

During this period, the average Berliner was around  underweight.

Alternative sources of food
Due to the meagre rations, the black market thrived, and thousands traded on it daily. Payment was either in cigarettes or by bartering.

The word fringsen entered the German vocabulary during 1945, meaning to steal to survive. This word is etymologically based on the surname of Cardinal Josef Frings, a senior figure in the Catholic Church of Cologne, who (in accordance with long-standing Catholic tradition) famously gave his blessing to those who had to steal in order to feed their family.

Der Elendswinter ("The miserable winter", 1945–46)
The winter of 1945–46 was one of the coldest winters in Berlin. About 40,000 people suffered from hypothermia and 1,000 died as a result. The Berlin Magistrat (municipal authority) created official Wärmeräume (warm rooms) for people to warm themselves in.

Crime
In 1946, Berlin was a haven of crime. There were an average of 240 robberies and five murders a day, and most criminals were the destitute and homeless in Berlin. In the areas east of the future Oder-Neisse line, Red Army soldiers committed cruelties against the German population, including countless rapes. Western Allied soldiers sometimes harassed German civilians too. Problems with law and order occurred in the areas that had still been controlled by the Wehrmacht on May 8, 1945 (e.g. western Austria, Bavaria, South Tyrol (Italy), East Frisia and Schleswig-Holstein), the date of the final German surrender.

Reconstruction and Stunde Null 
Also at the time of Stunde Null, Germany lay in ruins after the destruction wrought by World War Two. Following the war was a period of massive scale reconstruction. With roughly eighty percent of the country's infrastructure now in need of repair the German people saw an opportunity to reconstruct an old infrastructure into something more modern. They traded the condensed busy interiors of cities for newer, more expansive boulevards, opting to expand outward, creating more space to live in, rather than continuing the trend of condensing as they had done before. However, this project of reconstruction was and is still so great that the process of implementing the changes is not yet complete.

This seemed to be in line with the culture at the time: the fact that the devastation in Germany was so great made it easy to consider Germany new. Not only was the country now separated into east and west, but it was also almost entirely being rebuilt. So for people at the time it seemed like a new Germany.

Culture at the time of Stunde Null 
Germany at the time of Stunde Null was certainly very different from its former pre-war self. After the Allies had finished the war, and the concentration camps and the inhuman practices of the Nazis were revealed to the world, and Germany was put into a difficult public relations position (people like Thomas Mann saying things such as "Humanity shudders in horror at Germany!" (published in a Munich newspaper named Bayerische Landeszeitung)). The severity of Germany's crimes was almost universally recognized by the world, including Germany itself, so a culture of trying to escape that past was created. This spurred the idea that 1945 was not only an end, but a beginning too. This thought process began to appear more and more in German culture and speech, with people like Ernst Wiechert talking about making new beginnings in his 1945 address to Germany, talking of "a renewal of German spiritual life", or Werner Richter saying "The only possible source for a spiritual rebirth lies in an absolute and radical new beginning". But there were those that did not think that there would be a possibility for Germany to escape its Nazi past. As Karl Becker said "the German people will have lost all right to say that the German people is [are] not Hitler." This is what really created the culture that sought to wash away the wrongs of the predecessors, they wanted the respect and admiration on the world stage once again, and to do that they needed to distance themselves from this idea of Hitler and the Nazi party.

The idea of Stunde Null was even in the politics at the end of the war. British diplomat Robert Gilbert Vansittart wanted to offer German "barren nothingness", an "empty space in which they [Germans] must fill in with their own ideas if they have any." Even some of the diplomats negotiating with Germany seemed to want to honor the idea of Stunde Null, further propagating the culture of new beginnings instead of endings.

As a result of this new way of thinking, Germany entered into a new period of political rhetoric. A "race-less" Germany was created, Germany began to disconnect itself from its racialist past in favor of one that seemed to ignore the question in general. To a large extent, even scholars started to ignore questions about race, treating the end of World War II as if it solved all of these issues. But race was still very much an issue in the post-war period in Germany. Germany offered their quick acceptance of democratic ideals and customs as proof of their supposed 'race less' culture, but these same ideals were reintroducing racialization to Germany.

To most in Germany racialization was still a large problem in Germany post-war. For instance, many East European Jewish Holocaust survivors who resided in post-war displaced persons camps were considered "parasitic foreigners" who were stealing resources from the German people in need of them. Germany during reconstruction also looked toward the occupying powers for guidance in regards to these matters, but what they saw was segregationist U.S. military policies. But there was also those who sought to remember Germany's past.

For all the talk of new beginnings there was a movement to remember the past, and cope. This was called Vergangenheitsbewältigung (coping with the past), though not much of the politics of the time was shaped by this there were many people did not want Germany to simply forget the crimes it had committed during World War II.

Controversy 

In 1985, Richard von Weizsäcker, the President of West Germany at that time, stated "There was no 'Stunde Null' but we had the chance for a new beginning" ("Es gab keine Stunde Null, aber wir hatten die Chance zu einem Neubeginn."), implying that a true and total restart never occurred in postwar Germany. The term Stunde null implies that the past is over and nothing from former times continues to exist past the Stunde Null. Experts in German culture find that this term is divisive and is a barrier to the collective German psyche and their ability to deal with the recent past. The concept of Vergangenheitsbewältigung (coping with the past) is what experts allude to and Stunde null conflicts directly with this idea, necessitating its judicious use.

Use in music 
 An EP released in 1995 by German techno artist Cosmic Baby was entitled Stunde Null.
 The English band British Sea Power entitled the fourth track from their 2011 LP Valhalla Dancehall "Stunde Null".
 The German gothic metal band Eisheilig released a track named "Die Stunde Null" on their 2009 album Imperium.

Use in cinema 
 The 1948 neorealist film Germany, Year Zero by Roberto Rossellini depicts life in Berlin in the year after its near total destruction in World War II.

See also 
 Victory over Japan Day and the Gyokuon-hōsō that first announced it
 Victory in Europe Day

References

External links 
 The End as the Beginning, an exhibit at the Deutsches Historisches Museum 

Aftermath of World War II in Germany
German words and phrases
History of Germany